Tavor is the Modern Hebrew transliteration of תבור Tabor, the name of Mount Tabor.

Tavor may refer to:

Places
 Har Tavor (Mount Tabor), a hill in Israel
 Nahal Tavor (Tavor Stream), a watercourse in Israel
 Kfar Tavor (Tavor Village), a village in Israel

People
 Tavor, an Italian musician in the band Ufomammut
 Moshe Tavor (1917-2006), Israeli Nazi hunter
 , an Israeli actor

Other uses
 894th "Tavor" Search and Rescue Battalion, a unit of the IDF in the Israeli Home Front Command
 IWI Tavor, an Israeli rifle family
 Beit Tavor (Tabor House), a historic building in Jerusalem
 A brand name for Lorazepam, a drug belonging to the benzodiazepine family of tranquillizers

See also

 
 Tabor (disambiguation)